William Basil Weston  (3 January 1924 – 3 March 1945) was an English recipient of the Victoria Cross, the highest and most prestigious award for gallantry in the face of the enemy that can be awarded to British and Commonwealth forces.

Details
Weston was 21 years old, and a lieutenant in the Green Howards (Alexandra, Princess of Wales's Own Yorkshire Regiment), British Army, attached to 1st Battalion, West Yorkshire Regiment during the Second World War when the following deed took place for which he was awarded the VC.

On 3 March 1945 during the attack on Meiktila, Burma, Lieutenant Weston was commanding a platoon which, together with the rest of the company, had to clear an area of the town of the enemy. In the face of fanatical opposition he led his men superbly, encouraging them from one bunker position to the next. When he came to the last, particularly well-defended bunker, he fell wounded in the entrance. Knowing that his men would not be able to capture the position without heavy casualties he pulled the pin out of one of his grenades as he lay on the ground and deliberately blew himself up with the occupants of the bunker.

Victoria Cross medal
William Basil Weston's medal was placed on permanent loan at the Green Howards Museum at Richmond in 2001 by his nephew, Basil Weston of Ulverston.

References

British VCs of World War 2 (John Laffin, 1997)
Monuments to Courage (David Harvey, 1999)
The Register of the Victoria Cross (This England, 1997)

External links
 CWGC entry

1924 births
1945 deaths
People from Ulverston
Green Howards officers
British Army personnel killed in World War II
British World War II recipients of the Victoria Cross
West Yorkshire Regiment officers
British Army recipients of the Victoria Cross
Burials at Taukkyan War Cemetery
Military personnel from Lancashire